Molipteryx fuliginosa is a species of squash bugs belonging to the subfamily Coreinae.

Distribution
This species is present in Japan.

References

Insects of Japan
Mictini